TTA – Racing Elite League was a Swedish Touring Car Championship started in 2012, founded by four of the biggest teams in Swedish Touring Car racing; Polestar Racing, Flash Engineering, WestCoast Racing and Brovallen Design in 2011. TTA works with the Swedish Automobile Sports Federation and the race car is developed by the French motorsport company Solution-F. The car is a silhouette, where by the chassis and powertrain are standardized and custom-built for racing and where the body is molded from composite material to mimic a normal car.
 
TTA has bought the Swedish Racing League and renamed it to the TTA – Elitserien i Racing (TTA – Racing Elite League).

Latest season

The first season will consist of an eight round competition. The racetracks used for the 2012 season will be a mix of permanent and temporary racing circuits. The season begun at Karlskoga Motorstadion and will end with Göteborg City Race. The season will see four different models from four different manufacturers: BMW, Citroën, Saab and Volvo.

TV coverage
In Sweden, Viasat were given the broadcast rights to the 2012 season, giving live coverage on its TV10 sports channel.

Support races
Carrera – GT Cup
Trofeo Abarth 500 Sweden
Swedish GT Series
Swedish Radical Championship

References

External links

Touring car racing series
Auto racing series in Sweden